Abdul Shukur bin Jusoh (born 28 February 1989 in Terengganu) is a Malaysian professional footballer who plays for Malaysian side Terengganu II. Shukur plays mainly as an attacking midfielder but also can plays as a right winger.

Career statistics

Club

References

External links
 

1989 births
Living people
Malaysian footballers
Terengganu FC players
Selangor FA players
Felda United F.C. players
People from Terengganu
Malaysia Super League players
Association football wingers
Malaysian people of Malay descent
Southeast Asian Games gold medalists for Malaysia
Southeast Asian Games medalists in football
Competitors at the 2011 Southeast Asian Games